Himark Biogas Inc. is a waste-to-energy technology and engineering services company. Himark's provides services such as licensing of patented anaerobic digestion technology, conducting feasibility studies, carrying out project design, providing support on engineering and construction, commissioning, and rescue and resuscitation of digesters.

History 
The group was founded in 1976 as a mixed grain and purebred cattle farm and has since diversified into various businesses including management of feedlot, licensing of waste-to-energy technology, and management of biogas and ethanol plants.

Research 
As of 2014, the company has a research and development expenditure of over $ 35 million and has laboratories in Edmonton and Hairy Hill, Alberta.

Technology 
 IMUS

The Integrated Manure Utilization System "IMUS" is an anaerobic digestion technology that uses organic waste to produce biogas, which is used to produce electricity and heat. The "IMUS" system produces organic fertilizer and reusable water as bioproducts.

Anaerobic digestion technologies improves the local environment and community health, and helps in disease control, through effective hazardous waste disposal; fertilizer production; disease destruction; pollution prevention; odor elimination; and landfill replacement.

 Integrated Bio Refinery

The model integrates the anaerobic digestion technology with other energy consuming system, such as Municipal Facilities, Farm Operations, Open Pen Feedlots, Food Processing, Ethanol Plants, and Green Houses.

Type of waste 
The technology can utilize various kinds of feedstock types, including Municipal Organics, Cow Manure, Slaughter House waste, Milk and Cheese Waste, Feed Lot Waste, Sand Laden Waste, Food Processing Waste, Ethanol Co-Products and Human Waste.

References 

Companies based in Edmonton
Renewable energy technology companies
Technology companies of Canada
Waste management companies of Canada
Waste companies established in 1976
Canadian companies established in 1976
Agriculture companies established in 1976
Technology companies established in 1976